Francis Xavier Jin Yang-ke is the current serving bishop of the Roman Catholic Diocese of Ningbo Hangzhou in China.

Early life 
Francis was born in Cixi, Zhejiang, China, in January 1958.

Priesthood 
On 11 November 1990, Francis was ordained a priest and selected as the Coadjutor Bishop of Ningbo, China, in year 2012.

Episcopate 
Francis was consecrated as a bishop on 28 November 2012 and succeeded as a bishop on 25 September 2017. He was installed on 18 August 2020.

References 

1958 births

Living people